Bamidele Isa Yusuf (born 22 February 2001) is a Nigerian footballer who plays for Estoril as a forward or a winger.

Club career

Spartak Trnava
Yusuf was transferred to Slovak side Spartak Trnava in November 2019. He made his Fortuna Liga debut for Trnava on 23 February 2020 at OMS Arena against Senica, coming on as a substitute for Fanis Tzandaris in the second half in a 0–2 defeat.

Estoril Praia
Yusuf, from Spartak Trnava on September 1, 2022 Estoril he transferred to and signed a 5-year contract.
 Bamidele Yusuf played his first match in Portugal against Gil Vicente. On October 14, 2022, he played in 2022–23 Taça de Portugal in a 3-2 win over Amora. On December 1, 2022, in the cup match they played against Académico Viseu, he was ejected from the game with a red card in the 74th minute.

Career statistics

Club

Honours
Spartak Trnava
Slovnaft Cup: 2021–22

References

External links

 Footballdatabase Profile

  

2001 births
Living people
Nigerian footballers
Nigerian expatriate footballers
Association football forwards
FC Spartak Trnava players
Slovak Super Liga players
Expatriate footballers in Slovakia
Nigerian expatriate sportspeople in Slovakia
G.D. Estoril Praia players
Primeira Liga players